Riccardo Serena (born 29 September 1996) is an Italian footballer who plays as a midfielder for Serie D side Union San Giorgio-Sedico.

Club career
Serena played the first four seasons of his senior career in Serie D and Eccellenza (fourth- and fifth-tier).

On 12 July 2017, he signed a one-year contract with Serie C club Padova. He made his Serie C debut for Padova on 24 September 2017 in a game against Sambenedettese as an added-time substitute for Nico Pulzetti. His contract was extended for two additional seasons on 28 February 2018, as Padova advanced to Serie B at the end of the season.

On 9 January 2020, he joined Rieti on loan.

On 5 October 2020, his contract with Padova was terminated by mutual consent.

Personal life
His father Michele Serena is a football coach and a former player who appeared for Italy national football team and played for Juventus, Sampdoria, Fiorentina and Atlético Madrid, among others.

References

External links
 

Living people
1996 births
Footballers from Florence
Association football midfielders
Italian footballers
Calcio Padova players
F.C. Rieti players
Serie B players
Serie C players
Serie D players
Universiade medalists in football
Universiade bronze medalists for Italy
Medalists at the 2019 Summer Universiade